Two cars have been sold by Chery as the Chery Kimo in certain countries:

Chery A1, a supermini manufactured from 2007 to 2015
Chery QQ3, a city car manufactured beginning in 2012

Kimo
Subcompact cars